Paulinka is a comedy play in two parts by Belarusian poet and writer Yanka Kupala.)  Written in 1912, it was printed first time in 1913 in St. Petersburg by the publisher The Sun Will Peek into Our Window As Well (:be:Загляне сонца і ў наша аконца)

Plot
Paulinka is a daughter of a petty nobleman ("village szlachtic") Sciapan Krynicki. She falls in love with the local teacher Yakim Saroka. The father disapproves this planning her marriage with a wealthier szlachcic Bykovsky. Paulinka and Saroka are planning to run away, but Yakim is arrested for his revolutionary views, ratted out by Bykovsky.

Play directors often replace the finale with a more optimistic one: the pair does run away.

History
The play grew out of the short story And the Willows Rustled (А вербы шумелі) started by the author. It is suggested that the prototype of Paulinka was Kupala's lyrical friend , but in later years she denied this. Some also claim that Myadzyolka was first one to play Paulinka, which is not true: the first amateur play of Paulinka, starring Софья Маркевич, was in Vilnius in January 13, while Maydzyolka played next month in an amateur play in St.Petersburg.

In film
In 1952 a Russian-language TV play was released directed by Aleksandr Zarkhi and starring Lyudmila Senchina.

References

1913 plays
Belarusian plays